Like Mike: Music From the Motion Picture is the soundtrack to the 2002 film, Like Mike. It was released on July 2, 2002 through So So Def Recordings and consisted of hip hop and contemporary R&B with production from the likes of Jermaine Dupri, The Neptunes and Alicia Keys. The soundtrack spawned two singles, the first being "Basketball", a cover of Kurtis Blow's  1984 song, performed by Lil' Bow Wow featuring Jermaine Dupri, Fabolous and Fundisha. The other is "Take Ya Home" by Lil' Bow Wow, taken from his second album Doggy Bag, which serves as the theme song for the film.
It also features music from Amerie, Jagged Edge, Solange and more. The soundtrack is the final album with Lil' Bow Wow to feature the "Lil'" moniker in his name and is also Lil' Bow Wow's final album under So So Def.

Track listing
Informations taken from:

Chart performance 
The album found some success on the charts, making it to 18 on the Billboard 200 and 10 on the Top R&B/Hip-Hop Albums.

References

Sources 
http://www.imdb.com/title/tt0308506/soundtrack
http://www.artistdirect.com/nad/store/artist/album/0,,1701290,00.html
http://www.cduniverse.com/productinfo.asp?pid=3924111

Comedy film soundtracks
Hip hop soundtracks
2002 soundtrack albums
So So Def Recordings albums
Sports film soundtracks